The 2020–21 FC Dynamo Kyiv season was the club's 94th season in existence and the club's 30th consecutive season in the top flight of Ukrainian football. In addition to the domestic league, Dynamo Kyiv participated in this season's editions of the Ukrainian Cup, the Ukrainian Super Cup, the UEFA Champions League and the UEFA Europa League. The season covers the period from August 2020 to 30 June 2021.

Players

Squad information

Transfers

In

Out

Pre-season and friendlies

Competitions

Overview

Ukrainian Premier League

League table

Results summary

Results by round

Matches

Ukrainian Cup

Ukrainian Super Cup

UEFA Champions League

Qualifying phase and play-off round

Group stage

The group stage draw was held on 1 October 2020.

UEFA Europa League

Knockout phase

Round of 32
The round of 32 draw was held on 14 December 2020.

Round of 16
The round of 16 draw was held on 26 February 2021.

Statistics

Appearances and goals

|-
! colspan=16 style=background:#dcdcdc; text-align:center| Goalkeepers

|-
! colspan=16 style=background:#dcdcdc; text-align:center| Defenders

|-
! colspan=16 style=background:#dcdcdc; text-align:center| Midfielders

|-
! colspan=16 style=background:#dcdcdc; text-align:center| Forwards

|-
! colspan=16 style=background:#dcdcdc; text-align:center| Players transferred out during the season

Last updated: 13 May 2021

Goalscorers

Last updated: 13 May 2021

Clean sheets

Last updated: 13 May 2021

Disciplinary record

Last updated: 13 May 2021

Attendances

Last updated: 5 May 2021

Notes

References

External links

FC Dynamo Kyiv seasons
Dynamo Kyiv
Dynamo Kyiv
Ukrainian football championship-winning seasons